Crush the Losers (subtitled Unofficial Theme Song of the Games) is the third extended play by Australian rock band Regurgitator. Crush the Losers was released in September 2000, to coincide with the 2000 Summer Olympics, and peaked at number 64 on the ARIA singles chart.

The EP was supported with a radio promo and video clip of the title track; which poled at number 48 on the Triple J Hottest 100, 2000.

Track listing
 "Crush the Losers" (Quan Yeomans) - 3:50
 "Injury" (Ben Ely) - 2:30
 "Time in the Wilderness" (Shane Rudken) - 5:26
 "Physio" (Yeomans) - 3:26
 "Comeback (Eye of the Tiger)" (Survivor) - 3:23
 "Return of the Loser" (Closing Ceremony After Party Mix) (Yeomans) - 4:20

Charts

Release history

References

2000 EPs
EPs by Australian artists
Regurgitator albums
East West Records albums